China University of Geosciences may refer to two affiliated universities:

 China University of Geosciences (Beijing)
 China University of Geosciences (Wuhan)